Parliamentary elections were held in Chile on 4 March 1973. The Confederation of Democracy alliance won a majority of seats in both the Chamber of Deputies and the Senate.

Electoral system
The term length for Senators was eight years, with around half of the Senators elected every four years. This election saw 25 of the 50 Senate seats up for election.

Results

Senate

Chamber of Deputies

References

Elections in Chile
Chile
Parliamentary
March 1973 events in South America
Election and referendum articles with incomplete results